Nova Independência (Portuguese for "New Independence") is a municipality in the state of São Paulo in Brazil. The population is 4,053 (2020 est.) in an area of 265 km². The elevation is 316 m.

The municipality contains 21.6% of the  Aguapeí State Park, created in 1998.

References

Municipalities in São Paulo (state)